Allerdale is a non-metropolitan district of Cumbria, England, with borough status. Its council is based in Workington and the borough has a population of 93,492 according to the 2001 census, increasing to 96,422 at the 2011 Census.

The Borough of Allerdale was formed under the Local Government Act 1972, on 1 April 1974 by the merger of the municipal borough of Workington, the urban districts of Maryport, Cockermouth and Keswick; and the rural districts of Cockermouth and Wigton, all of which were within the administrative county of Cumberland. In 1995 Allerdale was granted borough status.

The name derives from the ancient region of Allerdale, represented latterly by the two wards of Cumberland, called Allerdale-above-Derwent and Allerdale-below-Derwent, the present borough corresponding largely to the latter with parts of the former. Much of the area during the medieval period was a royal forest subject to forest law.

In July 2021 the Ministry of Housing, Communities and Local Government announced that in April 2023, Cumbria will be reorganised into two unitary authorities.  Allerdale Borough Council is to be abolished and its functions transferred to a new authority, to be known as Cumberland, which will cover the current districts of Allerdale, Carlisle, and Copeland.

Settlements

Workington is the largest settlement in the borough, and is the seat of the borough council. Allerdale House in Workington is the meeting place and primary office space used by the council. The building is known locally as "Perry's Palace" after former council chief executive Tony Perry, who was responsible for its construction. Other settlements in the borough include: Abbeytown, Allonby, Aspatria, Bolton Low Houses, Bothel, Brigham, Broughton, Great Clifton, Cockermouth, Crosby, Dean, Dearham, Fletchertown, Flimby, Ireby, Keswick, Kirkbride, Maryport, Mawbray, Plumbland, Seaton, Silloth, Tallentire, Thursby, Waverton, Westnewton, and Wigton.

Freedom of the Borough
The following people and military units have received the Freedom of the Borough of Allerdale.

Individuals
 Malcolm Wilson: 28 March 2018.
 Ben Stokes: 25 September 2019.

Politics

Elections to the borough council are held every four years with 49 councillors being elected from 23 wards. No party has had a majority on the council since Labour lost their majority at the 2003 election. As of the 2019 election, the council is jointly administered by the Conservative Party and independents. Since March 2021 the leader of the council has been Mark Johnson, a Conservative.

Derwent 7 parishes
The Derwent 7 Community Led Planning Group was set up in 2007 by the town and parish councils of Above Derwent, Bassenthwaite, Borrowdale, Keswick, St John's, Castlerigg and Wythburn, Threlkeld and Underskiddaw, with funding from Allerdale Borough Council, and was still in existence in 2017. It had four subgroups including one on transport, and a co-ordinating "Cluster group".

The term "Derwent Seven Parishes" is used in defining the collecting scope of Keswick Museum, as Keswick is at the heart of the area covered by these parishes.

A map illustrating the area of the parishes is included in an appendix to a document produced by Sustainable Keswick.

Map

References

 
Non-metropolitan districts of Cumbria
English royal forests
1974 establishments in England
Boroughs in England